Chryseobacterium tenax  is a bacterium from the genus of Chryseobacterium which has been isolated from stones from the River Taff in Wales.

References

External links
Type strain of Chryseobacterium tenax at BacDive -  the Bacterial Diversity Metadatabase

tenax
Bacteria described in 2006